Cerithiopsis aquilum is a species of very small sea snails, marine gastropod molluscs in the family Cerithiopsidae. It was described by Rehder in 1980.

References

aquilum
Gastropods described in 1980